Hell-to-Pay Austin (also known, without hyphens, as Hell to Pay Austin) is a 1916 American silent comedy-drama film directed by Paul Powell and starring Wilfred Lucas in the title role, with Bessie Love, Eugene Pallette, and Mary Alden in supporting roles. Written by Mary H. O'Connor, the film was produced by D. W. Griffith's Fine Arts Film Company and distributed by Triangle Film Corporation. It is presumed lost.

Production 
Locations were filmed in San Diego, San Francisco, Bear Valley, Fresno, and Huntington Lake.

Plot 

When a minister dies from alcoholism, his daughter Briar Rose (Love), also called "Nettles", is unofficially adopted by a team of lumberjacks, including the rough-and-tumble 'Hell-to-Pay' Austin (Lucas). Nettles is so touched by the logging camp's tribute to her father, organized by Austin, that she chooses him to be her foster father. Her innocence and purity eventually transform Austin into an upstanding Christian.

One day, an elegant woman (Alden) stumbles into the logging camp. The lumberjacks and Nettles help her, and she invites Briar Rose to visit her in New York someday. Years later, Nettles goes away to boarding school in New York. When taunted by her fellow students, Nettles leaves the school to stay with the woman she had met previously. Austin comes to New York to rescue Nettles, and, reunited, they discover that their guardian/ward relationship has evolved into one of true love and they marry.

Cast

Release 
It was accompanied by the Charles Chaplin short comedy One A.M. in some theaters during its initial theatrical release and by the Fay Tincher short Skirts in some others.

References

External links 

 
 
 

1916 comedy-drama films
1916 lost films
1916 films
American black-and-white films
1910s English-language films
American silent feature films
Films about alcoholism
Films about orphans
Films directed by Paul Powell (director)
Films set in California
Films set in Manhattan
Lost American films
Triangle Film Corporation films
Lost comedy-drama films
1910s American films
Silent American comedy-drama films